Angelito Cabaron Gatlabayan (born July 3, 1952), also referred to by his initials ACG, is a Filipino politician. He was the first City Mayor of Antipolo following its transition to cityhood, serving from 1998 to 2007. He was a member of the House of Representatives of the Philippines representing the 2nd District of Antipolo during the 14th Congress from 2007 to 2010.

Early life
Gatlabayan was born in 1952 and raised by his parents, former Vice Mayor Maximo Leyva Gatlabayan and Catalina Legado Cabaronin, in Antipolo. Before serving as a politician, he held top positions in various multinational companies such as Handyware Philippines, and Union Ajinomoto Philippines.

Political career
As Antipolo transitioned from a municipality to a component city of Rizal, Gatlabayan was elected as its first city mayor on May 15, 1998 and was re-elected in a landslide victory to a second term on May 14, 2001. Mayor Gatlabayan was responsible for handling Antipolo's ₱800-million budget and served its 500,000 residents.

Under his leadership, Antipolo experienced an all-time high in tax revenues, the lowest unemployment rate in decades, a substantial improvement in healthcare services and a progressive and comprehensive relocation and housing program for the needy. He was able to multiply the city's economic resources to its highest point ever.

His administration focused on restoring ethics in the local government and elevating the quality of life in distant communities while utilizing fiscally sensible strategies and policies in reducing crime, corruption and illiteracy. Likewise, he made government services more efficient and accessible for his constituents.

The first initiative of his administration was a comprehensive plan to mitigate crime. This initiative brought down crime in Antipolo to its lowest point in 20 years. The highly successful Clean and Green Program was responsible for constant street-cleaning, periodical dredging of polluted canals and waterways and tree planting. This program earned the city the Gawad sa Pangulo sa Kapaligiran Award (1st Place for the Cleanest and Greenest City in Region IV and 2nd Place at the National Level).

Troubled by the worsening illiteracy condition of youth and adults in the city, he unveiled an ambitious initiative that championed the rights of children. Thus in 1999, the literacy program was conceived. It details long range plans to better prepare less privilege children for school. It motivates out-of-school youths and adults to pursue and education or skill. It facilitates the re-education of Dumagats ethnic group. It provides teaching facilities, faculty members, books, notebooks and classrooms in all 16 barangays.

A remarkable feat worth mentioning is that the young mayor was able to establish 14 public high schools in different barangays in just 1 year.

Economic development is another priority for him, in alleviating the poor sectors of the city, His most important triumph for the economic revitalization of Antipolo was the revolutionary way of increasing revenues from a ₱140 million mark to ₱600 million in his first term alone. This paved way for building modern infrastructures, systematized water system, facilitating lightning fixtures throughout the city.

At year 2007, He ended his post as the city Mayor and then was elected once again via landslide victory as the 2nd District Representative of Antipolo.

He was a member of eleven (11) standing committees back at the Congress, which includes the Committee on Appropriation which passed the 2008 General Appropriations Act or the 2008 National Budget.

References

 

Members of the House of Representatives of the Philippines from Antipolo
Mayors of places in Rizal
People from Antipolo
1952 births
Living people
Kabalikat ng Malayang Pilipino politicians
Adamson University alumni
Mayors of Antipolo